Olivette Thibault (November 13, 1914 – December 17, 1995) was a Canadian stage, film and television actress from Quebec. She is most noted for her role as Tante Cécile in Mon oncle Antoine, for which she won the Canadian Film Award for Best Supporting Actress in 1971.

Her other roles included the films Deliver Us from Evil (Délivrez-nous du mal), Kamouraska and Cordélia, and the television series Quelle famille!, La p'tite semaine, Peau de banane and The Mills of Power (Les Tisserands du pouvoir).

References

External links

1914 births
1995 deaths
Canadian film actresses
Canadian stage actresses
Canadian television actresses
Best Supporting Actress Genie and Canadian Screen Award winners
French Quebecers